Sideroxylon acunae is a species of plant in the family Sapotaceae. It is endemic to Cuba.

References

Endemic flora of Cuba
acunae
Vulnerable plants
Taxonomy articles created by Polbot